The 1919 Minnesota Golden Gophers football team represented the University of Minnesota in the 1919 college football season. In their 20th year under head coach Henry L. Williams, the Golden Gophers compiled a 4–2–1 record (3–2 against Big Ten Conference opponents). The 1919 team finished in a tie for fourth place in th Big Ten. Halfback Arnold Oss was named All-Big Ten first team.

Schedule

References

Minnesota
Minnesota Golden Gophers football seasons
Minnesota Golden Gophers football